Rufus and Flora Bates House is a historic home located in the South Hill neighborhood of Ithaca in Tompkins County, New York. It was built about 1828 and is a -story, five bay, center entrance frame dwelling in the Greek Revival style.  It is sheathed in clapboard and has a three bay wing.  It was the home of Rufus Bates, one of the early presidents of the Village of Ithaca.

It was listed on the National Register of Historic Places in 2009.

References

Houses on the National Register of Historic Places in New York (state)
Greek Revival houses in New York (state)
Houses completed in 1828
Houses in Tompkins County, New York
Buildings and structures in Ithaca, New York
National Register of Historic Places in Tompkins County, New York